Rawdna Carita Eira (born 6 October 1970 in Elverum) is a Norwegian and Sámi playwright and author. She grew up in Brønnøysund in Nordland county in Norway and trained to be a teacher. She has worked as a reindeer herder, stage manager and playwright associated with Beaivváš Sámi Theatre. She has written lyrics for her own songs and tunes by, among others, Mari Boine. Eira published a bilingual book in 2011, ruohta muzetbeallji ruohta/løp svartøre løp, which was nominated for the Nordic Council Literature Prize in 2012. She lives in Kautokeino.

Selected works
 "Grense", short stories in Gába 1998:1-2
 Elle muitalus/ Elens historie, drama, 2003 
 Kjøttstykker, short stories in Kuiper 2008:3-4
 Arktisk Hysteri, drama, 2011 (with Mette Bratzeg) 
 Maijen i huldrelandet, radio story for children in 19 parts, 2008
 Guohcanuori šuvva/ Sangen fra Rotsundet, drama, 2011  
ruohta muzetbeallji ruohta/løp svartøre løp  ("Running, Svartöra, maturity!"), Gyldendal, 2011,

External links
 Sami Film - Mari Boine - Music For The Kautokeino Rebellion - Kautokeino-opproret (Guovdagneaidnu) 1852 - Lyrics by Rawdna Carita Eira

1970 births
Living people
People from Elverum
People from Brønnøy
People from Kautokeino
20th-century Norwegian women writers
Norwegian dramatists and playwrights
Norwegian Sámi-language writers
20th-century Norwegian writers
21st-century Norwegian writers
21st-century Norwegian women writers